Schultes is a surname. Notable people with the surname include:

 Josef August Schultes (1773–1831), Austrian botanist and professor in Vienna, father of Julius
 Julius Hermann Schultes (1804–1840), Austrian botanist in Vienna
 Richard Evans Schultes (1915–2001), American ethnobotanist

See also